Northern Illinois College of Law may refer to:

Northern Illinois University College of Law in Dekalb, Illinois
Dixon College in Dixon, Illinois, which also used the name Northern Illinois College of Law